Banjara Nagar (also known as Banjara Nagar Thanda) is a village/Thanda in Rangareddy district of Telangana, India. It falls under Madgul Mandal. It is 3 km from Madgul Mandal. Jairam Thanda & Dubba thanda are the neighbouring thandas.

History 

Banjara Nagar is the alliance of four thandas namely 1. Balu Thanda 2. Valya thanda 3. Pakira thanda 4. Hunya thanda. Jaaths in thanda are mostly Ramavath, Kodavath, Jatooth and Jarupla.

Despite of many Jaaths in Banjara Nagar, there is a very happy, friendly & Peaceful environment here.

Economy and education 

The traditional commerce are agriculture and trade. Lambanis are also nomadic cattle herders. and how a day people have been employed mostly in Studying and farming.

It comprises two Primary Schools and most of the youths in thanda are literate, but drive taxies, auto rikshaw, employed as chiefs and waiters in hotels and a few are pursuing Graduates and Post-Graduates Courses in Education and very few are employed.

References

External links
 ;– (Website)

Villages in Ranga Reddy district